General Sir Howard Douglas, 3rd Baronet,  (23 January 1776 – 9 November 1861) was a British Army officer born in Gosport, England, the younger son of Admiral Sir Charles Douglas, and a descendant of the Earls of Morton. He was an English army general, author, colonial administrator and Member of Parliament for Liverpool.

Early life
Following the death of his mother, Sarah Wood Douglas, in 1779, Howard was raised by his aunt, Helena Baillie, near Edinburgh. As a boy, he wanted to join the Royal Navy and follow in the footsteps of his father and older brother. His father agreed to take him to sea when he was 13, but Sir Charles died of apoplexy while in Edinburgh just after he arrived to collect Howard in 1789. Howard's guardians thought it better that he serve in the Army instead, and he entered the Royal Military Academy, Woolwich, in 1790. He was commissioned Second Lieutenant in the Royal Artillery in 1794, becoming Lieutenant a few months later.

Early career
In 1795 he was shipwrecked while in charge of a draft for Canada, and lived with his men for a whole winter on the Labrador coast. Soon after his return to England in 1799 he was made a Captain-Lieutenant. In his regimental service during the next few years, he was attached to all branches of the artillery in succession, becoming Captain in 1804, after which he was placed on half-pay to serve at the Royal Military College (RMC), then located at High Wycombe. He taught military strategy and was an authority on military and naval engineering. He served intermittently as commandant of the senior department and as inspector general of instructions at the RMC. In 1804, Douglas was appointed to a majority in the York Rangers, a corps immediately afterwards reduced. He remained on the roll of its officers until promoted Major-General. The senior department of the RMC at High Wycombe, of which he was in charge, was the forerunner of the Staff College. Douglas was promoted brevet Lieutenant-Colonel in 1806. He served in 1808–09 in the Peninsular War and was present at the Battle of Corunna, after which he took part in the Walcheren Campaign.

On the death of his half-brother, Vice-Admiral Sir William Douglas in 1809, he succeeded to the baronetcy. In 1812 he was employed in special missions in the north of Spain, and took part in numerous minor operations in that region, but he was soon recalled, the Home Government deeming his services indispensable to the Royal Military College. He became brevet Colonel in 1814 and CB in 1815. He became a fellow of the Royal Society on 25 January 1816.

Early writings and promotion to Major-General
In 1816 appeared his Essay on the Principles and Construction of Military Bridges, in 1819, Observations on the Motives, Errors and Tendency of M. Carnots System of Defence, and in the following year his A Treatise on Naval Gunnery (of which numerous editions and translations appeared up to the general introduction of rifled ordnance). In 1821 he was promoted Major-General. Douglas's criticisms of Carnot led to an important experiment being carried out at Woolwich in 1822, and his Naval Gunnery became a standard text-book, and indeed first drew attention to the subject of which it treated.

Lieutenant-Governor of New Brunswick
Sir Howard Douglas became Governor of New Brunswick (1823–31). He had to deal with the Maine boundary dispute with the United States of 1828. He also founded Fredericton College (King's College), now known as the University of New Brunswick, of which he was the first Chancellor. He was governor during the Miramichi fire of 1825, and his actions during that crisis increased his popularity with the people of the province. He secured a charter for King's College at Fredericton (later the University of New Brunswick). Some subsequent light is shed on local society in his period of office in the novel Lady Rosamond's Secret. A Romance of Fredericton (1878) by the Rebecca Agatha Armour.

Later career in Europe

On his return to Europe he was employed in various missions, and he published about this time Naval Evolutions, a controversial work dealing with the question of breaking the line. From 1835 to 1840 Douglas, then a GCMG, was Lord High Commissioner of the Ionian Islands, where, amongst other reforms, he introduced a new code of laws. In 1837 he became a Lieutenant-General, in 1840 a KCB, in 1841 a civil GCB, and in 1851 a full general. He was given the colonelcy of the 99th (Lanarkshire) Regiment of Foot from 1841 to 1851 when he transferred as colonel to the 15th (the Yorkshire East Riding) Regiment of Foot, a position he held until his death in 1861.

From 1842 to 1847 Douglas sat as a Conservative Member of Parliament (MP) for Liverpool, where he took a prominent part in debates on military and naval matters and on the corn laws. He was frequently consulted on important military questions.

His later works included Observations on the Modern System of Fortification. and On Naval Warfare With Steam

Personal life
In 1797, while in Quebec City, Douglas fathered a daughter, Margaret (or Marguerite), but did not marry the mother, Catherine Normandeau. In 1799, he returned to England, and in July of that year he married Anne Dundas, daughter of James Dundas. They had ten children, Major Charles Douglas, James Dundas Douglas, Howard Douglas, General Sir Robert Percy Douglas, 4th Baronet of Carr, Reverend William Frederick Douglas, Ann Douglas, Christina Douglas, Lucy Douglas, Sarah Mary Harcourt Douglas, and Mary Douglas.

Sir Howard Douglas died in Tunbridge Wells.

Honors
Douglas was elected a Fellow of the Royal Society, and one of the founders of the Royal Geographical Society. He was awarded an honorary Doctor of Civil Law from the University of Oxford. Shortly before his death he declined the offer of a military GCB.

His service as  Lord High Commissioner of the Ionian Islands is recognized by an obelisk on the island of Corfu.

Notes

References

Further reading

External links

Biography at the Centre for Newfoundland Studies Archives, Memorial University Library Website
Sir Howard Douglas

|-

|-

1776 births
1861 deaths
People from Gosport
Baronets in the Baronetage of Great Britain
British Army generals
British Army personnel of the Napoleonic Wars
Conservative Party (UK) MPs for English constituencies
East Yorkshire Regiment officers
Fellows of the Royal Society
Knights Grand Cross of the Order of St Michael and St George
Knights Grand Cross of the Order of the Bath
Members of the Parliament of the United Kingdom for Liverpool
UK MPs 1841–1847
Graduates of the Royal Military Academy, Woolwich
Royal Artillery officers
Persons of National Historic Significance (Canada)
Academic staff of the Royal Military College of Canada
Governors of the Colony of New Brunswick